BioJS is an open-source project for bioinformatics data on the web. Its goal is to develop an open-source library of JavaScript components to visualise biological data. BioJS develops and maintains small building blocks (components) which can be reused by others. For a discovery of available components, BioJS maintains a registry .

History

The first version of BioJS was released in 2012 by John Gomez. It was developed as a JavaScript library of web components to represent biological data in web applications. Version 2.0 included a complete redesign of the library and was released in 2014 as a Google Summer of Code project led by Manuel Corpas and developed by David Dao and Sebastian Wilzbach. Since then over 100 people contributed to the project. Currently more than 150 components are available in the BioJS registry.

Selected list of published components

 DAG Viewer
 DNA Content Viewer
 FeatureViewer
 HeatMapViewer
 Intermine analysis
 Intermine endpoints
 KEGGViewer
 PPI-Interactions
 PsicquicGraph
 Sequence
 wigExplorer
 treeWidget

Institutions using BioJS 

 EBI
 ELife
 InterMine
 Berkeley Lab
 OpenPHACTS
 Rostlab
 TGAC

See also 

 BioJava, Biopython, BioRuby, BioPHP, BioPerl, Bioconductor
 Open Bioinformatics Foundation

References

External links
 
 

Free bioinformatics software